Jan-Ove Waldner (born 3 October 1965), in Sweden commonly J-O Waldner (is a Swedish former table tennis player. He is often referred to as "the Mozart of table tennis." A sporting legend in his native Sweden as well as in China, he is known in China as 老瓦 Lǎo Wǎ ("Elder Waldner") or 常青树 Cháng Qīng Shù ("Evergreen Tree"), because of his extraordinary longevity and competitiveness. As of July 2021, he is the only person to win an  Olympic table tennis gold medal representing a non-Asian country.

Biography
Jan-Ove Waldner was born in Stockholm on 3 October 1965. His athletic potential was recognised at an early age and was displayed in 1982 when, as a 16-year-old, he reached the final of the European Championships, losing to distinguished left-handed teammate Mikael Appelgren, who was perceived then as the logical successor to the first Swedish World Champion, Stellan Bengtsson. While still developing his game, Waldner, along with several other Swedish players, traveled to a national-level training camp held in China, and was reportedly amazed by the dedication and solidarity of the Chinese players. He has claimed ever since that he learned much during his stay, and thereafter first began to regard his opportunity to succeed in table tennis as paramount.

Waldner won gold in the men's singles at 1992 Summer Olympics, becoming the first and to date only player not from China, Japan, or South Korea to win an Olympic table tennis title.  Eight years later, he won silver in the same event at the 2000 Summer Olympics, narrowly losing to Kong Linghui.

In China, a country that adores table tennis, he is undisputedly the best-known Swedish person, and still one of the most well-known sports personalities. In the 1990s, he was more recognisable in China than then-President of the United States Bill Clinton. His venerable status and long career has led to his being nicknamed "the evergreen tree" (Chang Qing Shu) in Mandarin. He is considered by many to be the most technically complete player of all time, and is almost inarguably the most successful non-Chinese player of the sport.

In 2010 Waldner won his ninth Swedish championship, defeating Pär Gerell, who was born the same year Waldner became Swedish national champion for the first time.

He played for TTC Rhön-Sprudel Fulda-Maberzell in the German Bundesliga until May 2012. In May 2012 Stefan Frauenholz, Fulda-Maberzell's President, confirmed that Jan-Ove Waldner finished his contract with the club. Timo Boll: "Was yesterday's match against us the last one for Jan-Ove Waldner?" referring to the  Bundesliga semifinal between Borussia Düsseldorf and Fulda-Maberzell. This ended his career at the international elite level, at the age of 46 years.

In 2012 he began playing for Spårvägens BTK.

On 11 February 2016, Waldner played his last game in the Swedish first league for Ängby/Spårvägen and officially announced his retirement as a player.

When he retired, Waldner had been playing international elite level table tennis for more than thirty years, which is somewhat unusual in the table tennis world given that hand–eye coordination and quick reactions are essential. Some young Chinese players whom he has recently played against were trained by those he played against in the 1990s, who were in turn trained by others he played in the 1980s.

He is one of the seven table tennis players who competed at the first five Olympic Games table tennis tournaments since the sport's introduction at the Games in 1988. The others are Swede Jörgen Persson, Croatian Zoran Primorac, Belgian Jean-Michel Saive, Hungarian Csilla Bátorfi, Serbian-American Ilija Lupulesku, and German Jörg Roßkopf.

He was also the first of only five male players in the history of table tennis to achieve a career grand slam (World Champion, World Cup and Olympic gold medal winner in singles) (in 1992). The others are: Liu Guoliang, China (in 1999), Kong Linghui, China (in 2000), Zhang Jike, China (in 2012), and Ma Long, China (in 2016).

Olympic Games
 1988 Final 8 in single, final 8 in double
 1992 Gold medal in single, first round in double
 1996 Final 16 in single, final 8 in double
 2000 Silver medal in single, final 16 in double
 2004 Fourth in single, final 8 in double

World championships
 1983 Silver medal in team competition
 1985 Silver medal in team competition
 1987 Silver medal in single, silver medal in team competition
 1989 Gold medal in single, gold medal in team competition
 1991 Silver medal in single, gold medal in team competition
 1993 Bronze medal in single, gold medal in team competition
 1995 Silver medal in team competition
 1997 Gold medal in single (21-0 in games), silver medal in double
 1999 Bronze medal in single
 2000 Gold medal in team competition
 2001 Bronze medal in team competition

European Championships
 1982 Silver medal in single
 1984 Silver medal in double, bronze medal in team competition
 1986 Gold medal in double, gold medal in team competition
 1988 Gold medal in double, gold medal in team competition
 1990 Gold medal in team competition
 1992 Silver medal in double, gold medal in team competition
 1994 Silver medal in single, silver medal in team competition
 1996 Gold medal in single, gold medal in double, gold medal in team competition
 1998 Bronze medal in double, bronze medal in team competition
 2000 Bronze medal in single, gold medal in team competition
 2002 Gold medal in team competition

Swedish Championships
 1981 Gold medal in double
 1982 Gold medal in double
 1983 Gold medal in single
 1984 Gold medal in single
 1986 Gold medal in single, gold medal in double
 1987 Silver medal in double
 1989 Gold medal in single, silver medal in double
 1991 Gold medal in single, gold medal in double
 1992 Gold medal in double
 1993 Silver medal in double
 1994 Silver medal in single, gold medal in double
 1996 Gold medal in single
 1997 Gold medal in single, silver medal in double
 1999 Gold medal in double
 2006 Gold medal in single
 2010 Gold medal in single
 2011 Gold in inter branch tournament

See also
 List of athletes with the most appearances at Olympic Games

Notes

References
 Svenskar i världen (Swedes in the World), Spring edition 2005, Swedish magazine.

External links
 
 
 
 
 
 
 Swedish championship statistics
 
 Jan-Ove Waldner at Table Tennis Media
 Chinese TV interview mixed with video clips of his career
 Jan-Ove Waldners website for Chinese fans
 Jan-Ove Waldners website for English speaking fans
 Waldner retires

1965 births
Living people
Sportspeople from Stockholm
Swedish male table tennis players
Olympic table tennis players of Sweden
Olympic gold medalists for Sweden
Olympic silver medalists for Sweden
Olympic medalists in table tennis
Table tennis players at the 1988 Summer Olympics
Table tennis players at the 1992 Summer Olympics
Table tennis players at the 1996 Summer Olympics
Table tennis players at the 2000 Summer Olympics
Table tennis players at the 2004 Summer Olympics
Spårvägens BTK players
World Table Tennis Championships medalists
Medalists at the 1992 Summer Olympics
Medalists at the 2000 Summer Olympics